This is a list of public art in the London Borough of Haringey.

Alexandra Park

Crouch End

Highgate
Highgate is partly located outside the borough of Haringey; for works not listed here see the relevant sections for the boroughs of Camden and Islington.

Muswell Hill

Tottenham

West Green

Wood Green

References

Bibliography

External links
 

Haringey
Haringey
Tourist attractions in the London Borough of Haringey